Otis Grand (born February 14, 1950, Beirut, Lebanon) is an American blues musician, best known for his album, Perfume and Grime (1996).

Biography
Although born in Beirut, Grand has spent much of his life in the United States. He played with local blues musicians at Eli's Mile High Club in Oakland, California, and made contacts that would later prove useful; such as Joe Louis Walker who produced his debut album, Always Hot (1988). He later cited his early influences as being B.B. King, Otis Rush, Johnny Otis and T-Bone Walker. By the late 1980s, Grand was based in the UK where he and his Dance Kings became a popular nightclub act. He was voted 'Best UK Blues Guitarist' seven years running (1990–1996) by the British Blues Connection magazine. In 1991, Grand co-starred with his backing band and Guitar Shorty, on the My Way or the Highway album.

Joe Louis Walker also played on Grand's next album, He Knows the Blues (1992) alongside Calvin Owens, Alfred "Pee Wee" Ellis, and the singer Jimmy Nelson. The album was nominated for a W.C. Handy Award. Nothing Else Matters (1994) involved Curtis Salgado, Sugar Ray Norcia, and Kim Wilson, whilst Walker and Salgado returned for Perfume and Grime (1996) which also utilised Luther Allison and Darrell Nulisch.

In 1997, Grand guested on Joe Louis Walker's album, Great Guitars. In March 2009, Grand appeared on stage at the Arts Centre in Cranleigh, Surrey, England.

In addition to living in Lebanon and the United States, Grand has lived in France and currently resides in Croydon, England, Grand remains an incisive guitarist. His latest album, Hipster Blues, was released on May 21, 2007.

Discography
Always Hot (1988, Indigo)
My Way or the Highway (1991, JSP) with Guitar Shorty
He Knows the Blues (1992, Volt)
Big Blues From Texas (1993, JSP) with Phillip Walker
The Return of Honk! (1994, JSP) with Joe Houston
Nothing Else Matters (1994, Sanctuary)
Perfume & Grime (1996, Sequel)
Grand Union (1998, Valley Entertainment) with Anson Funderburgh and Debbie Davies
Guitar Brothers (2002, JSP) with Joe Louis Walker
Hipster Blues (2007, Bliss Street)
Blues '65 (2012, MainGate)

References

External links
 
 Videos and photograph at NME

1950 births
Living people
American blues guitarists
American male guitarists
American blues singers
American male songwriters
20th-century American guitarists
20th-century American male musicians